Unionen is a Swedish white-collar trade union.

The union was formed on 1 January 2008, when the Swedish Union of Commercial Salaried Employees merged with the Swedish Union of Clerical and Technical Employees in Industry.  Like both its predecessors, it affiliated to the Swedish Confederation of Professional Employees.  Unionen is the biggest trade union in Sweden and the biggest white-collar union in the world. In 2014, it was joined by the Pharmacy Union, and in 2019 by the Association of Forestal, and Agricultural Employees. The union had 403,623 members on formation, and grew to 566,331 members by 2019.

Presidents
2008: Mari-Ann Krantz
2008: Cecilia Fahlberg
2015: Martin Linder

References

External links

Trade unions established in 2008
Trade unions in Sweden